Living Daylights is a jazz trio from Seattle composed of Jessica Lurie (alto/tenor sax and flute), Arne Livingston (bass), and Dale Fanning (drums).  They have toured with  John Scofield, Groove Collective, Robert Walter, Wayne Shorter, Maceo Parker, and Soulive.

Discography
 Falling Down Laughing (1995)
 500 Pound Cat (1998)
 Electric Rosary (2000)
 Night of the Living Daylights (2003)

External links
 Review of Electric Rosary by All Things Considered, December 6, 2000



American jazz ensembles from Washington (state)
Jam bands
Jazz fusion ensembles
Musical groups from Washington (state)